Felipe Posse (born 9 October 1925) was a Uruguayan boxer. He competed in the men's light heavyweight event at the 1948 Summer Olympics.

References

External links
 

1925 births
Possibly living people
Uruguayan male boxers
Olympic boxers of Uruguay
Boxers at the 1948 Summer Olympics
Sportspeople from Montevideo
Light-heavyweight boxers